Robin Stevens (born ) is a South African rugby union player for the  in the Pro14. His regular position is hooker.

Following the liquidation of the Southern Kings, Stevens signed for the  ahead of the 2021 season.

References

South African rugby union players
Living people
1996 births
Rugby union hookers
Southern Kings players
Eastern Province Elephants players